Turkey Creek is a stream in Lincoln County in the U.S. state of Missouri. It is a tributary of Cuivre River.

Turkey Creek was so named on account of wild turkeys in the area.

See also
List of rivers of Missouri

References

Rivers of Lincoln County, Missouri
Rivers of Missouri